Ryan Embry Beaver (born March 17, 1984) is an American country music singer-songwriter from Emory, Texas.  Born on March 17, 1984, and growing up in East Texas, Beaver moved South and began his musical career while he was attending Texas State University in San Marcos, Texas. Beaver currently lives in Nashville, Tennessee.

Career 

Beaver's first album, Under the Neons, was released on February 27, 2008. The album spawned 3 singles for Texas radio: "I Shoulda Kissed You", "Under the Neons", and "Streets of Austin".

Beaver's second album, Constant, was released February 8, 2011.  David Grissom produced the album, with co-write credits for himself, Wade Bowen, Brian Keane, Ben Danaher, and Paul Eason.  "For A While", "Hate", and "Nobody Wants to be Alone" were the singles sent to radio respectively.  "Hate" became Beaver's highest charting single to date (#2 for 3 weeks) on the Texas Music Chart and earned a "Favorite Song of 2011" nod from galleywinter.com.

Country Weekly described his lyrics as "thoughtful, introspective, and extremely well crafted" in their December 10, 2012, issue.

Beaver's first music video for "How About You" was featured on CMT Pure, CMT.com, Yallwire.com, NoDepression.com among others.

Songwriting 

A BMI writer, Beaver co-wrote "Along the Way" and "More Than Willing" with Rob Baird (I Swear It's The Truth released on Carnival Records). He also co-wrote "Day by Day", "Make Or Break Me" and "Leavin' Stephenville" with Kyle Park, the latter two appearing on Park's Make Or Break Me album released in 2011.  As of 2017, Beaver is signed to the Nashville-based publishing company, SMACKSongs.

Discography

Albums

Music videos

References

External links 

 

1984 births
Living people
American country singer-songwriters
People from Hunt County, Texas
Singer-songwriters from Texas
People from Rains County, Texas
21st-century American singers
Country musicians from Texas